A serinette is a type of mechanical musical instrument consisting of a small barrel organ. It appeared in the first half of the 18th century in eastern France, and was used to teach tunes to canaries. Its name is derived from the French serin, meaning “canary.”

Serinettes are housed in a wooden case, normally of walnut, and typically measuring 265 × 200 × 150 mm. The instrument is played by turning a crank mounted on the front. The crank pumps a bellows to supply air to the pipes, and also turns a wooden barrel by means of gears. Driven into the barrel are brass pins and staples with which the pieces of music are encoded. Mounted over the barrel is a bar carrying wooden keys connected to valves by vertical wooden rods. As the barrel turns, the pins and staples lift the keys, in turn opening the valves to let air into the pipes, which are located at the rear of the instrument. Tunes are selected by first lifting the bar carrying the keys, then shifting the barrel along its length. This brings a different set of pins and staples in line with the keys.

Most serinettes contain one rank of ten metal pipes at 2' pitch and play eight different tunes. Each tune lasts about 20 seconds and is normally of quick tempo and contains considerable ornamentation. A paper label pasted inside the lid listed the tunes available; one of the most common was “La petite chasse.”

Serinette construction was remarkably consistent; instruments built a hundred years apart by different makers can bear a strong similarity. Many builders worked in and around Mirecourt in the Lorraine region of France.

The sound of the serinette is similar to that of the piccolo.

References
Ord-Hume, Arthur W.J.G., “Bird organ.” The New Grove Dictionary of Music and Musicians. 2nd ed. New York, 2001. vol. 3 p. 605.
François Bédos de Celles, The Organ-Builder. Translated by Charles Ferguson. Raleigh, 1977. pp. 306-308.

External links
Anonymous serinette in the Museum of Fine Arts, Boston
Website of Bernard Pin, restorer of serinettes and related instruments (includes recordings of a serinette)

Organs (music)
Mechanical musical instruments
French musical instruments